Ozyptila confluens is a crab spider species found in Southern Europe and Syria.

References 

confluens
Spiders of Europe
Arthropods of Syria
Spiders of Western Asia
Spiders described in 1845